Yuridia del Carmen Peña Durán (born December 20, 1998) is a Mexican model and beauty pageant titleholder who participated in Mexicana Universal 2019 on June 23, 2019, where she won the title of Mexicana Universal Internacional 2020. She represented Mexico in Miss International 2022 pageant held in Tokyo, Japan.

Early life 
Yuridia was born on December 20, 1998, in Ahuacatlán, Nayarit. As of 2019 she was studying to become a dental surgeon at the Universidad Autónoma de Nayarit.

Pageantry 
At 19 years old, Yuridia was crowned Reina de la Feria de Nayarit 2018.
That same year, when she was still holding this title, she decided to participate in Mexicana Universal Nayarit 2018, which took place on December 15, 2018, where she was the winner. On June 23, 2019, the final of Mexicana Universal was held and Yuridia managed to win the title of Mexicana Universal Internacional 2020, being crowned by Mariem Velazco, Miss International 2018.

On September 25, 2021, Yuridia was a special guest at the Reina de la Feria Ahuacatlán 2021 pageant, during which she tripped on the hem of her long gown and fell down, causing her crown to slip from her head. She represented Mexico at Miss International 2022 pageant that took place in Tokyo Dome, Japan. Where she failed to rank in the top 15.

References

External links 

Mexican female models
1996 births
Living people
Miss International 2021 delegates